Moorgate was one of the City of London's northern gates in its defensive wall, the last to be built. The gate took its name from the Moorfields, an area of marshy land that lay immediately north of the wall.

The gate was demolished in 1762, but gave its name to a major street, Moorgate, laid out in 1834. The area around the street and around Moorgate station is informally also referred to as Moorgate. The Moorgate district is home to many financial institutions and has many notable historic and contemporary buildings.

Moorgate station was the site of the Moorgate tube crash of 1975, when a Northern City Line train failed to stop and hit a brick wall killing 43. This resulted in systems, known as Moorgate control,  being installed on the Underground in order to stop trains at dead-ends.

The gate

The earliest descriptions of Moorgate date from the early 15th century, where it was described as only a postern in the London city wall. Located between Bishopsgate and Cripplegate and leading to a marshy open space known as Moorfields, it was not one of the larger or more important of the city gates.

In 1415 an ordinance enacted that the old postern be demolished.  It was replaced with a newer and larger structure located farther to the west, which included a wooden gate to be shut at night.  This gate was enlarged again in 1472 and 1511, and then damaged in the Great Fire of London in 1666.  Although the City gates had ceased to have any modern function apart from decoration, it was replaced along with Ludgate, Newgate, and Temple Bar with a stone gate in 1672.

Moorgate and the Wall originally formed the northern boundary of Coleman Street Ward. It appears that the area outside, the once very marshy Lower and Little Moorfields (now mostly occupied by Finsbury Circus and the surrounding buildings), previously part of the Manor of Finsbury were added in the 17th century, though it was not developed until 1817.

Moorgate was demolished with most of the other London city wall gates in 1761/2, and the resulting stone was sold for £166 to the City of London Corporation to support the starlings of the newly widened centre arch of the London Bridge.

Little Moorgate was a postern opposite Little Winchester Street leading into Moorfields. It had been demolished by 1755, but gave its name to a street  that was later removed for the building of a railway.
JK;J-P=9HYT

Moorgate Street and locality

The area around the former gate, Moorgate Street and Moorgate station is referred to informally as the Moorgate area. This locale roughly approximates to the Coleman Street Ward of the City of London.

The contemporary street of Moorgate runs north from Princes Street and Lothbury at the back of the Bank of England, across the road named London Wall and the location of the old gate, and then continues north. After leaving the City of London in the direction of the London Borough of Islington, the street is known as Finsbury Pavement (which at one time was known as Moor Fields Pavement) and then City Road. The street was constructed around 1846 as one of the new approaches to London Bridge. While the street was formally known as "Moorgate Street", the street part of the name eventually fell out of use.

The Chartered Accountants' Hall, on Moorgate Place, is the home of the Institute of Chartered Accountants in England and Wales.

The Guildhall is connected to Moorgate station via Bassishaw Highwalk. The Guildhall is the home of the City of London Corporation and the centre of City government since the Middle Ages. Adjacent and internally connected to the Guildhall is the Guildhall Art Gallery, which houses the art collection of the City of London. It occupies a stone building in a semi-Gothic style which was completed in 1999 to replace an earlier building destroyed in 1941.

The Moorfields were an extensive area of open land, partly in the City of London, partly in the Manor of Finsbury. The Lower Moorfields was home to the Bethlem Royal Hospital (also known as Bedlam, Europe's oldest psychiatric hospital) from 1676 to 1815.

The Lower Moorfields was developed in 1817, with the building of Finsbury Circus. Finsbury Circus includes a number of classical buildings surrounding an oval-shaped circus. The gardens in the centre of the circus occupy a  plot enclosed by railings, and include the lawn of the City of London Bowls Club.

Moorgate is also the birthplace of John Keats, one of the principal poets in the English Romantic movement.  Keats was born in 1795 in the Swan and Hoop Inn at 199 Moorgate, where his father was an ostler. The pub is now called "The John Keats at The Globe", having previously been known as "The Moorgate Coffee House", "The Moorgate" and "The John Keats at Moorgate", only a few yards from Moorgate station.

A new commercial development on Moorgate, known as Moor House, opened in 2005. The building is located at the corner of Moorgate and London Wall, and was designed by Foster and Partners. The building has  of office space in 19 storeys, and is built in the location of a smaller office building built in the 1960s known as Moor House. A 36 m shaft under the building incorporates part of Crossrail's new station and ticket hall serving Liverpool Street.

During the 1940s-60s, HM Customs and Excise investigation staff were based at Moorgate Hall, 153 Moorgate.

There is a campus of the London Metropolitan University, formerly a polytechnic, and part of the London Guildhall University, on Moorgate. The campus houses its business school, a library, and other administrative facilities.

A number of large buildings are being planned or already built in the neighbouring streets. These include a 43-storey, 140 m residential skyscraper at Milton Court (The Heron), that is taller than CityPoint, and a 90 m office tower at Ropemaker Place is also being developed by British Land, with construction already underway.

Nearest places
 Barbican Estate

Nearby rail and Tube
National Rail
Liverpool Street station
Moorgate station

London Underground
Moorgate station: Northern line (city branch), Circle, Hammersmith & City and Metropolitan lines

Bus routes 
Moorgate is served by the following bus routes: 21, 43 (24 hour), 76 (24 hour), 100, 141, 153, 214 (24 hour), 271 (24 hour) and Night Bus route N551 (Towards Gallions Reach on a temporary diversion)

Notes

References 

Books and articles
 Lange, D. The Queen's London: A Pictorial and Descriptive Record of the Streets, Buildings, Parks and Scenery of the Great Metropolis. Cassell and Company, London, 1896.
 Harris, C. M. What's in a name? The origins of the names of all stations in current use on the London Underground and Docklands Light rail with their opening dates. Midas Books and London Transport, fourth edition, 2001. .
 Mills, A. D. Dictionary of London Place Names. Oxford University Press, 2004. .
 Rocque, J. Rocque's Map of London. 1746 and 1763.
 Harben, H. A. A Dictionary of London. 1918.
 Stow, J. Survey of London. 1720 and 1755. 2 volumes.
 Colvin, Sidney. John Keats - Biography. 1887.
 Motion, A. Keats. University of Chicago Press, 1998. .
 Holloway, S. Moorgate: Anatomy of a Railway Disaster. Trafalgar Square Publishing, 1989. .
 Bacon, J. M. The Dominion of the Air, Chapter 3. Online extract.

Other web sites
 Metronet history of the Circle Line. Retrieved 31 March 2005.
 Metronet history of the Hammersmith and City Line. Retrieved 31 March 2005.

External links

BBC News account of the 1975 crash
 Moorgate station. Official homepage of the station from Metronet
 John Rocque's Map of London - 1746.
Streetmap.co.uk . The map is centred on the Moorgate campus of London Metropolitan University
 BBC nature walks - Roman London and a geological walk of the world.
 Moors Gate.

Major buildings
Emporis information on the new Moor House
Emporis information on the old Moor House
CapitaLand homepage on 25 Moorgate
City of London Corporation homepage on Guildhall

Vincenzo Lunardi
Hydrogen balloon model. Site with information about the balloon attempt and a model of the hydrogen balloon.
Flights of fancy. Site with information about the balloon attempt.
Balloon Corner, Welham Green. Site with picture of the stone marking the landing spot of Lunardi's balloon at Welham Green.
Streetmap.co.uk  showing Welham Green and Ware in Hertfordshire

Buildings and structures demolished in 1762
London Wall and its gates
Streets in the City of London
Districts of the City of London
Central business districts in the United Kingdom